KANP (91.3 FM) is a radio station licensed to Ashton, Idaho, United States. The station airs a Christian format, as an affiliate of Your Network of Praise, and is currently owned by Hi-Line Radio Fellowship.

References

External links
 

ANP